Hyloxalus pinguis is a species of frog in the family Dendrobatidae. It is endemic to Colombia where it is only known from its type locality, on the Cordillera Central, the Cauca Department.
Its natural habitats are cloud forests. The type locality is in the Puracé National Natural Park.

References

pinguis
Amphibians of the Andes
Amphibians of Colombia
Endemic fauna of Colombia
Amphibians described in 1990
Taxonomy articles created by Polbot